Sidhwan is a village in Nakodar, a tehsil in the city Jalandhar of Indian state of Punjab.

Geography 
Sidhwan is connected by railways through the railway station Sidhwan. Sidhwan is approximately 425 kilometers from New Delhi and almost 120 kilometers from Amritsar. Nawa Pind Shonkia Da is the neighbouring village of Sidhwan.

References

Villages in Jalandhar district
Villages in Nakodar tehsil